Tim Taylor (born 4 October 1982 in Derby, England) is a former rugby union player who played at fly-half.

Career 
Taylor made his first appearance for Gloucester when he came off the bench against Worcester in the Anglo-Welsh Cup. A week later he started his first game against Harlequins at the Twickenham Stoop in the same competition and scored a try and a match winning conversion to send Gloucester into the semi-finals. Taylor initially signed on loan but after just three appearances he signed a two-year contract. Taylor went on to score one more try in a Guinness Premiership defeat away to Newcastle Falcons. In 2012, Taylor signed a two-year contract extension with Gloucester until the end of the 2013–14 season.

On 6 March 2014, Taylor announced retirement from rugby with immediate effect because of his long-term knee injuries. He remained with Gloucester as their new Kicking and Skills Coach.

References

External links
Gloucester profile

1982 births
Living people
Gloucester Rugby players
Leicester Tigers players
English rugby union players
Rugby union fly-halves
Rugby union players from Derby